The Mauldin-Hall House, at 501 S. Roselawn Ave. in Artesia, New Mexico, was built in 1909.  It was listed on the National Register of Historic Places in 1984.

It is a one-and-a-half-story L-shaped house with elements of Queen Anne style.  It was built of artificial stone.

References

National Register of Historic Places in Eddy County, New Mexico
Queen Anne architecture in New Mexico
Houses completed in 1909